Beach volleyball competition at the 2017 Commonwealth Youth Games was held in Nassau, Bahamas from 18 to 21 July 2017 at Roscoe A. L. Davis Soccer Field, Queen Elizabeth Sporting Complex.

Medalists

Medal table

Results

Boys

Preliminary

Pool A

|}

Pool B

|}

References

External links
Official website

2017 Commonwealth Youth Games events
Commonwealth Youth Games
2017